WBFZ (105.3 FM) is a radio station licensed to serve Selma, Alabama, United States. The station is owned by Imani Communications Corporation, Inc. It airs an urban contemporary/gospel format.

History
This station received its original construction permit from the Federal Communications Commission on June 17, 1998. The new station was assigned the call letters WBFZ by the FCC on August 10, 1998. WBFZ received its license to cover from the FCC on August 16, 2001.

The station has expanded its reach to over 100,000 listeners throughout the Black Belt daily.

References

External links

BFZ
Radio stations established in 2001
Gospel radio stations in the United States
Dallas County, Alabama